The Sin of Anna Lans is a 1943 Swedish drama film directed by Rune Carlsten.

Cast
 Viveca Lindfors as Anna Lans
 Arnold Sjöstrand as Olle Olsson
 Gudrun Brost as Magda
 Åke Grönberg as Axel
 Lisskulla Jobs as Birgit Lans
 Nils Lundell as Grönkvist
 Rune Carlsten as Bertil Agne
 Harriet Bosse as Baroness Löwenfeldt
 Hjördis Petterson as Mrs. Herlen
 Hugo Björne as Maj. Hellström

References

External links
 

1943 films
1943 drama films
Swedish drama films
Swedish black-and-white films
1940s Swedish-language films
1940s Swedish films